The Calgary 88's was a professional basketball franchise based in Calgary, Alberta, from 1988 to 1992. The team played in the World Basketball League. The 1992 season saw the league fold before the season was completed.
 
The 88's played their home games at the Olympic Saddledome.  Their best players during their time in Calgary consisted of Jim Thomas (Indiana) Chip Engelland (Duke), Darryl MacDonald (Texas A&M) John Spencer (Howard U), Chris Childs (Boise St), Kelby Stuckey (SW Missouri), Roland Gray (Saint Louis), Jerry Stroman (Utah), Nikita Wilson (LSU), Carlos Clark, David Henderson, Andre Turner, Sidney Lowe, Kelsey Weems, Perry Young, John Hegwood, Corey Gaines, and David Boone. Calgary coaches included Mike Thibault and Roger Lyons. In five seasons, the 88's went 151-78.

References
WBL Stats

88
Defunct basketball teams in Canada
World Basketball League teams
Basketball teams in Alberta
1988 establishments in Alberta
1992 disestablishments in Alberta
Basketball teams established in 1988
Sports clubs disestablished in 1992